Oliver Ibielski (30 January 1971 – 25 December 2017) was a German lightweight rower. He won a gold medal at the 1998 World Rowing Championships in Cologne with the lightweight men's eight. He died in 2017.

References

1971 births
2017 deaths
German male rowers
World Rowing Championships medalists for Germany